Arthur Edward Middleton (2 November 1891 – 19 October 1953) was a British politician who served as the Chair of London County Council.

Middleton qualified as an accountant and served on the council of the Society of Incorporated Accountants and Auditors.  He was a supporter of the Labour Party, and in 1942 was appointed to London County Council as an alderman.  In 1946, he was elected to represent Islington North on the council, and then from 1952 he again served as an alderman.  In addition, he served on the Royal Commission on the Press.

In April 1953, Middleton was elected as chair of London County Council, and in July he was knighted.  However, he died suddenly in October.

References

1891 births
1953 deaths
English accountants
Labour Party (UK) councillors
Members of London County Council
20th-century English businesspeople